West Point is a city in Troup and Harris counties in the U.S. state of Georgia. It is located approximately halfway between Montgomery, Alabama and Atlanta along Interstate 85. As of the 2010 census, it had a population of 3,474, and in 2015 the estimated population was 3,728. Most of the city is in Troup County, which is part of the LaGrange Micropolitan Statistical Area, and hence part of the Atlanta-Athens-Clarke County-Sandy Springs, GA Combined Statistical Area. A sliver in the south is in Harris County, which is part of the Columbus Metropolitan Statistical Area.

History
The city's present name comes from its being near the westernmost point of the Chattahoochee River, where the river turns from its southwesterly flow from the Appalachian Mountains to due south – for all practical purposes – and forms the boundary with Alabama. The large nearby reservoir, West Point Lake, was created by the Army Corps of Engineers by the building of the West Point Dam, for water storage and hydroelectric power generation. The reservoir stores water which can be released during dry seasons, in order to maintain the water level of the navigable inland waterway from Columbus, Georgia, south to the Gulf of Mexico.

During the late spring of 2003, there was a flood caused by extremely heavy rainfall and thunderstorms upstream of the West Point Dam; the weather caused the water level in the reservoir to come close to overflowing the top of the dam. There were allegations of poor forecasting by the Corps of Engineers of the reservoir's water levels. The flood water would have overflowed the dam had a large amount of water not been released through the spillway of the dam. Whereas this prevented the catastrophic failure of the West Point Dam, the city endured a flood much more severe than any other in the time since the dam had been built.
 
In the mid-19th century, the Atlanta & LaGrange Railroad was established and soon renamed the Atlanta & West Point Railroad, using the name of West Point; the city of East Point, Fulton County, Georgia, received its name for being at the northeastern end of this railroad line. The rail line linked metropolitan Atlanta with the lower reaches of the Chattahoochee River, with Columbus, and with Montgomery, Alabama, via the Montgomery & West Point Railroad.

Passenger service between Atlanta and Montgomery continued, on the "West Point Route", until approximately the beginning of the Amtrak era, or more than 100 years (circa 1855–circa 1970). The Montgomery-to-West Point rail line was completed in 1851, three years before the West Point-to-Atlanta segment. Rail operations were seriously disrupted during the Civil War (1861–65), as Southern rail lines were subject to Union Army attacks.

Toward the end of the war, West Point was the scene of the Battle of West Point (April 16, 1865, seven days after Lee's surrender at Appomattox).

Geography
West Point is located primarily in the southwest corner of Troup County, with a portion extending south into the northwest corner of Harris County. It is bordered to the northeast by the city of LaGrange, the Troup County seat. The city is bordered to the west by the Chattahoochee River, across which are the cities of Lanett and Valley, Alabama.

Interstate 85 runs northeast to southwest through the city, leading northeast  to Atlanta and southwest  to Montgomery, Alabama. Other highways that run through the city include U.S. Route 29, Georgia State Route 18, and Georgia State Route 103.

Demographics

2020 census

As of the 2020 United States census, there were 3,719 people, 1,579 households, and 970 families residing in the city.

2000 census
As of the census of 2000, there were 3,382 people, 1,354 households, and 931 families residing in the city. The racial makeup of the city was 40.60% White, 57.84% African American, 0.03% Native American, 0.89% Asian, 0.15% from other races, and 0.50% from two or more races. Hispanic or Latino of any race were 0.62% of the population.

There were 1,354 households, out of which 28.7% had children under the age of 18 living with them, 38.7% were married couples living together, 26.5% had a female householder with no husband present, and 31.2% were non-families. 28.7% of all households were made up of individuals, and 12.7% had someone living alone who was 65 years of age or older. The average household size was 2.50 and the average family size was 3.07.

29.4% of the city's population were under the age of 18, 6.4% were from 18 to 24, 25.0% from 25 to 44, 23.0% from 45 to 64, and 16.2% were 65 years of age or older. The median age was 37 years. For every 100 females, there were 82.0 males. For every 100 females age 18 and over, there were 75.9 males.

The median income for a household in the city was $31,886, and the median income for a family was $37,797. Males had a median income of $32,271 versus $22,135 for females. The per capita income for the city was $16,735. About 16.4% of families and 19.9% of the population were below the poverty line, including 25.1% of those under age 18 and 13.0% of those age 65 or over.

Economy
Kia Motors opened an automobile factory in West Point in 2009. Since 2011, the West Point auto factory has been manufacturing models of the Kia Telluride, Kia Sorento, and Kia K5.

Batson-Cook Construction was founded in West Point in 1913. It continues to be headquartered in West Point.

West Point Iron Works was founded in West Point three years after the Civil War ended. The company started off as a supplier of individual components, such as pulleys and gears, to nearby textile mills. In the 1930s the company was renamed West Point Foundry and Machine Co. In the 2000s, having been negatively impacted by imports (cloth) the company turned to SEETAC to seek assistance to use the firm's engineering and production expertise to provide products to the U.S. military. The firm also changed its name to West Point Industries to emphasize its broader client base. West Point now also makes component parts for manufacturers in a wide range of industries.

Education
Troup County High School and Long Cane Middle School, located in LaGrange, serve the children of West Point and the surrounding area.

Point University, formerly Atlanta Christian College, a private Christian university in East Point, moved their campus to West Point in 2012.

Notable people
Drew Ferguson, politician
Dorothy Kirby, professional golfer
Alex Moore, American football player
Joe Palmisano, baseball player
Ansley Truitt, basketball player

2019 Kia Super Bowl advertisement 
In 2019, automobile manufacturer Kia recorded a mini-documentary about West Point, titled "A Small Georgia Town", about the declining textile-town that was revitalized by the construction of the motor plant. Kia also ran an ad about the town during the 2019 Super Bowl, titled "Give It Everything". Kia has pledged the money that would have been spent endorsing a celebrity to pay for local students in need to attend college or a tech school.

The ad received generally negative reviews from critics, claiming it is "generic" and "preachy", with Oxford Road stating "For once, just once, could an auto manufacturer please stop just talking in generic platitudes and substantiate one claim?", "It sounds like this poor young man was asked to read a script saying the car is made of, for, and by hopeless people."

Gallery

References

External links

Battle of West Point

Cities in Georgia (U.S. state)
Columbus metropolitan area, Georgia
Cities in Harris County, Georgia
Cities in Troup County, Georgia
Georgia populated places on the Chattahoochee River